The Rookie: Feds is an American police procedural crime drama television series and spin-off of The Rookie. Created by Alexi Hawley and Terence Paul Winter for ABC, the series follows Simone Clark, the oldest rookie in the FBI Academy. Niecy Nash-Betts, Felix Solis, Frankie Faison, Britt Robertson, Kevin Zegers, and James Lesure were cast in starring roles. The series basic premise and its characters were introduced through a two-episode backdoor pilot in The Rookie. It premiered on September 27, 2022.

Cast and characters

Main
 Niecy Nash-Betts as Special Agent Simone Clark, a former Washington, D.C. school counselor who, at the age of 48, finally achieved her lifelong dream of joining the FBI.  After spending her first day with the Los Angeles Field Office's Background Check Unit, she was assigned to SSA Garza's Special Investigative Unit.  Her training agent is SA Carter Hope.
 Frankie Faison as Christopher "Cutty" Clark, Simone's father. He was wrongfully convicted when Simone was nine years old and spent eight years in prison before being exonerated. As a leader of the Black Lives Matter movement, he is initially unhappy about his daughter's career change. However, he eventually reconciles with her and allows her to move back in with him.
 James Lesure as Special Agent Carter Hope, a career FBI agent assigned to SSA Garza's Special Investigative Unit. He serves as SA Simone Clark's training agent, and is usually annoyed by Simone's more unorthodox methods. However, he comes to respect her methods as they show success. As the series begins, he and his estranged wife are pursuing a divorce, and he is looking for a promotion to New Orleans to be near his children as his estranged wife looks to relocate.
 Britt Robertson as Special Agent Laura Stensen, a former member of the FBI Behavioral Science Unit now assigned to SSA Garza's Special Investigative Unit. She also serves as SSA Garza's confidant and SA Brendon Acres' training agent. Once the youngest agent of the BSU, she went on leave when she caught her fiancé, Sam, in bed with her best friend. She is hoping to use her time in the Unit as a step towards the career she once had.
 Felix Solis as Supervisory Special Agent Matthew "Matt" Garza, the team leader of the newly formed Special Investigative Unit with the Los Angeles Field Office (which his superiors agreed to let him run but plan to scrap the second his unit fails), intending to focus more on police work than "FBI bureaucratic procedure". He's also dealing with some health issues.
 Kevin Zegers as Special Agent Brendon Acres (birth name Brendon Butkus), Simone's fellow graduate of the FBI Academy who's also assigned to SSA Garza's Special Investigative Unit. His training agent is SA Laura Stensen.  Before joining the Bureau, he was an award-winning actor who starred on the popular young-adult television series Vampire Cop for six years. He was pushed into acting by his single father after his mother left the family.

Recurring
 Michelle Nuñez as Special Agent Elena Flores, the Special Investigative Unit's tech analyst and SSA Garza's niece.
 Devika Bhise as Antoinette Benneteau, an FBI lab tech and Brendon's love interest.
 Courtney Ford as Special Agent in Charge Tracy Chiles, Garza's immediate superior.
 Jessica Betts as DJ, Simone's love interest.

Guest
 Thomas Dekker as Eli Reynolds (alias Jeffrey Boyle)
 Eric Roberts as Josh Reynolds, Eli's father.
 Oceanne Iradukunda as Special Agent Simone Clark's Inmate fellow.
 Deniz Akdeniz as Mark Atlas, Laura Stensen's former partner in the BSU.
 Tom Arnold as Miles Butkus, Brendon's manipulative father.
 David Ramsey as Greg Wright
 Dia Nash as Billie, Simone's daughter
 Mateo Pollock as Max, Simone's son
 Wallace Langham as Alan Brady
 Teddy Sears as George Rice
 Donna Mills as Layla Laughlin, a cosmetics businesswoman.

Crossover characters from The Rookie
 Nathan Fillion as Police Officer III John Nolan, the oldest rookie of the LAPD who befriended Simone Clark when she was in Los Angeles.
 Alyssa Diaz as Detective I Angela Lopez, a detective with the LAPD Mid-Wilshire Division.
 Brent Huff as Police Officer III Quigley Smitty, a veteran, but lazy officer with the LAPD Mid-Wilshire Division.
 Melissa O'Neil as Police Officer II Lucy Chen. 
 Eric Winter as Sergeant I Tim Bradford.
 Richard T. Jones as Sergeant II Wade Grey
 Shawn Ashmore as Wesley Evers

Episodes

Backdoor pilot (2022)
For the backdoor pilot, "No. overall" and "No. in season" refer to the episode's place in the order of episodes of The Rookie.

Season 1 (2022–23)

Production

Development
On February 8, 2022, it was announced that ABC was in the process of developing a spin-off of The Rookie centered around the FBI. It was also reported that the series would be introduced through a two-episode backdoor pilot in the parent series. At the time it was reported ABC was looking to expand its franchises after losing Black-ish, in an effort to compete with NBC's Chicago and Law & Order franchises as well as the FBI and NCIS franchises that air on CBS. On May 13, 2022, it was ordered to series under the title The Rookie: Feds. The Rookie creator Alex Hawley, co-created the series with Terence Paul Winter, both of whom also executive produce alongside Michelle Chapman, Bill Norcross, Corey Miller, star Niecy Nash, and The Rookie star Nathan Fillion. ABC Signature and Entertainment One serve as production companies. Entertainment One will also distribute the series internationally. On October 21, 2022, the series received a full season order, bringing up the season to a total of 22 episodes.

Casting
Niecy Nash-Betts was the first to be cast as Simone Clark, "a tour de force and the oldest rookie at the FBI Academy." Kat Foster and Felix Solis were cast in March 2022 to portray Casey Fox and Matthew Garza, five- and twenty-year FBI veterans, respectively. Frankie Faison also joined the cast as Christopher "Cutty" Clark, Simone's father. When the series was ordered it was reported that Foster and her character Fox would not progress past the backdoor pilot. Britt Robertson joined the main cast in June 2022 to play Laura Stensen, a former member of the FBI behavioral analysis unit. Later that month, Kevin Zegers was cast as Brendon Acres, a former actor who recently joined the FBI. The following day, Deadlne reported that James Lesure was also cast as Carter Hope, a former lawyer in the Department of Justice who is now training Clark. In September 2022, it was announced that Jessica Betts, Tom Arnold, Eric Roberts, and Deniz Akdeniz had been cast in guest-starring roles. Nathan Fillion and Alyssa Diaz appeared in the series premiere as John Nolan and Angela Lopez, respectively, their characters from The Rookie.

Release
When ABC announced its fall schedule for the 2022–23 television season, it was revealed that the series would air on Tuesdays at 10:00 p.m. ET leading out of Bachelor in Paradise. ABC Entertainment President Craig Erwich defended the decision not to pair The Rookie: Feds with The Rookie, by saying that they wanted to keep The Rookie in its Sunday timeslot and that they felt that Bachelor in Paradise would be a strong lead-in for a new series. Erwich also stated that in spite of not airing together, crossovers between The Rookie and The Rookie: Feds would still be possible. The series premiered on September 27, 2022.

Reception

Critical response
The review aggregator website Rotten Tomatoes reported an 86% approval rating with an average rating of 7.7/10, based on 7 critic reviews.

Ratings

References

External links
 

2020s American crime drama television series
2020s American police procedural television series
2022 American television series debuts
American action television series
American Broadcasting Company original programming
American television spin-offs
English-language television shows
Television series about the Federal Bureau of Investigation
Television series by ABC Studios
Television series by Entertainment One